Nayzak Air Transport was an airline based in Tripoli, Libya. Its main base is Tripoli International Airport.

History

Destinations
Nayzak Air Transport operates the following services (as of July 2009) :

Bayda (La Abraq Airport)
Benghazi (Benina International Airport)
Kufra (Kufra Airport)
Sabha (Sabha Airport)
Tripoli (Tripoli International Airport)

Tunis (Tunis-Carthage International Airport)

Manchester (Manchester Airport)

Fleet
The Nayzak Air Transport fleet includes the following aircraft (as of 19 July 2009) :

2 Boeing 737-400 (which are operated by Czech Airlines)

References

External links
Nayzak Air Transport
 Nayzak Air Transport 
Nayzak Air Transport Fleet

Defunct airlines of Libya